Taskeen Rahman is a Bangladeshi actor. He made his debut in the 2017 released film Dhaka Attack. He played the role of an antagonist in the film. He was appreciated by critics for his performance in the film.

Career 
Taskeen Rahman lived in Australia from 2002 through 2017. As of December 2017, he intended to return to Bangladesh to work in the film industry. He has a bachelor's degree in forensic science and a master's degree in business management. His research for his PhD assessment is ongoing.

Rahman's next release would be Mission Extreme, directed by Sunny Sanwar and Faisal Ahmed.

Filmography

References

External links
 
 

Living people
Bangladeshi male film actors
Australian people of Bangladeshi descent
Bangladeshi emigrants to Australia
Place of birth missing (living people)
1981 births